No. 2 Squadron, nicknamed the Minhasians, is a Multi-role, fighter squadron of the Pakistan Air Force (PAF). It is named after Pilot Officer Rashid Minhas, the youngest & PAF's sole recipient of the Nishan-e-Haider Gallantry medal.

Aircraft flown

Gallery

See also
List of Pakistan Air Force squadrons

References

Pakistan Air Force squadrons